Chałupki  is a village in Racibórz County, Silesian Voivodeship, Poland. Its total area is .777 km2.

It lies on the border with Czech Republic, on the Chałupki - Bohumín railway line.

The population was 725 as of 2015.

References

External links 
 Jewish Community in Chałupki on Virtual Shtetl

Villages in Racibórz County